The 1994 PBA Governors Cup Finals was the best-of-7 championship series of the 1994 PBA Governors Cup, and the conclusion of the conference playoffs. The Alaska Milkmen and Swift Mighty Meaty Hotdogs played for the 59th championship contested by the league.

The Alaska Milkmen won their 2nd PBA title with a 4–2 series victory over the Swift Mighty Meaty Hotdogs.

Qualification

Series scoring summary

Games summary

Game 1

The Meaties without enforcer Rudy Distrito, who is serving a five-game suspension, held an imposing 77–61 spread in the fourth quarter and despite blowing a 16-point lead, hang tough when the Milkmen with Johnny Abarrientos orchestrating the plays, came to within 85–86, only to falter in the end.

Game 2

Game 3

Alaska played hard-nosed defense, strangled the meaties in the endgame. Alex Araneta nearly lost the ball but scored to shove the Milkmen ahead, 86–84. After Swift was forced into a turnover, Sean Chambers' running shot pushed Alaska on top by four with less than a minute remaining. The Mighty Meaties opened a 12-point lead early in the third quarter at 60–48, but the Milkmen battled back and were only trailing by a point, 70–71, going into the final period.

Game 4

In almost a repeat of Game three, a 12–4 tear by Alaska in the last five minutes iced Swift's downfall.

Game 5

Alaska took an early 24–12 lead in the first quarter. The Meaties banked on a big second quarter as Rudy Distrito ignited a 9–0 blast that allowed Swift to equalized at 42-all and later turn the tables in the next five minutes in a 16–6 run to take a 58–48 lead, a near free-for-all happened with 30.7 seconds left in the second quarter, Swift leading, 66–55, as Jojo Lastimosa reacted on a hard foul by Swift import Herb Jones that sent him crashing to the floor, action was halted for nearly five minutes and play was resumed after technical fouls were slapped on Jones, Bonel Balingit and Roehl Gomez. The Milkmen came back in the third period to cut the deficit to four, 80–84, but Swift immediately responded to the uprising as Vergel Meneses and Nelson Asaytono went to work and the Meaties opened leads of 19 points, 108–89 in the fourth quarter.

Game 6

Swift came back from 17 points down in the first quarter to take a 63–62 lead on a short stab by import Herb Jones midway in the third period that turned out to be the Meaties' last taste of the lead as Alaska launched a decisive 16–0 run that broke their backs as the Milkmen zoomed to a 78–63 advantage at the end of the third quarter.

Rosters

Broadcast notes

References

External links
PBA official website

1994 PBA season
1994
Alaska Aces (PBA) games
Pop Cola Panthers games
PBA Governors' Cup Finals